Sergey Levitsky may refer to:
 Sergey Lvovich Levitsky (1819–1898), photographer
 Syarhey Lyavitski (born 1990), footballer